Afriyie is a surname. Notable people with the surname include:

Adam Afriyie (born 1965), English politician
Hannah Afriyie (born 1951), Ghanaian sprinter
Kwaku Afriyie (born 1987), Ghanaian-German footballer
Kolja Afriyie (born 1982), Ghanaian-German footballer
Opoku Afriyie, Ghanaian footballer
Owusu Afriyie (born 1980), Ghanaian footballer

Given name
Afriyie Acquah (born 1992), Ghanaian footballer

Surnames of Akan origin